This is the discography for Dutch DJ and record producer Dyro.

Extended plays

Compilation albums

Singles

Remixes 
The following is an incomplete list of remixes by Dyro, with year of remix release, track name, original artist, and label:

References 

Discographies of Dutch artists
Electronic music discographies